Eleonora Mærsk is one of the world's largest container ships operated by A. P. Moller and registered to Svendborg, Denmark. It was constructed in 2006 at the Odense Steel Shipyard. There are seven other identical sister ships in the A. P. Moller fleet.

Hull and engine
Eleonora Mærsk was built by the Odense Steel Shipyard in yard 205. It is a fully cellular container ship with 23 holds, and a total carrying capacity of 15,500 TEU. This ship has a working crew of around 13 people at one time.

The vessel is powered by a Wärtsilä-Sulzer 14RTFLEX96-C diesel engine, capable of producing  driving one propeller. This 2-stroke, 14 cylinder engine was built by the Doosan Engine Company in Changwan. When constructed, the vessel utilized one  and five  auxiliary generators.

Information
The ship was specifically designed to sail through the Asian trade route, and has the largest combustion engine ever built. Its engine is the equivalent of 1,000 family-sized cars.

References 

Merchant ships of Denmark
Container ships
Ships of the Maersk Line
Ships built in Odense
2006 ships